Iglesia de Santa Eulalia may refer to:

 Iglesia de Santa Eulalia (Abamia), a church in Asturias, Spain
 Iglesia de Santa Eulalia (Selorio), a church in Asturias, Spain